Goephanes zebrinus is a species of beetle in the family Cerambycidae. It was described by Fairmaire in 1897.

References

Goephanes
Beetles described in 1897
Taxa named by Léon Fairmaire